The 2009 Navy Midshipmen football team represented the United States Naval Academy as an independent in the 2009 NCAA Division I FBS football season. The Midshipmen, led by second-year head coach Ken Niumatalolo, played their home games at the Navy–Marine Corps Memorial Stadium.

On November 7, 2009 athletic director Chet Gladchuk announced that Navy had accepted an invitation to play in the Texas Bowl on Thursday, December 31 at Reliant Stadium in Houston, Texas against the Big 12 Conference's Missouri Tigers. This mark was the first time that Navy had gone to bowl games in seven straight seasons. Navy won the 2009 Texas Bowl, 35–13, and finished with a record of 10–4.

Schedule

Personnel

Game summaries

Notre Dame

vs. Army

References

Navy
Navy Midshipmen football seasons
Texas Bowl champion seasons
Navy Midshipmen football